Newington High School is a public high school located in Newington, Connecticut, on Route 174/Willard Avenue.  Its address is 605 Willard Avenue.  All students in the town of Newington seeking a public high school education attend Newington High School.

Notable alumni

 Bill Rodgers (Class of 1966) Olympian and 4-Time Boston Marathon and 4-Time New York City Marathon Champion

References

External links
 

Educational institutions in the United States with year of establishment missing
Public high schools in Connecticut
Newington, Connecticut
Schools in Hartford County, Connecticut